Huixtla is a town and one of the 119 municipalities of Chiapas, in southern Mexico.

As of 2010, the municipality had a total population of 51,359, up from 48,476 as of 2005. It covers an area of 385 km².

As of 2010, the city of Huixtla had a population of 32,033. Other than the city of Huixtla, the municipality had 250 localities, the largest of which (with 2010 populations in parentheses) were: Francisco I. Madero (1,804), Colonia Obrera (1,427), Cantón Rancho Nuevo (1,123), and Cantón las Delicias (1,062), classified as rural.

References

Municipalities of Chiapas